Yamandu is a town in the Kono District in the Eastern Province of Sierra Leone.  The population is predominantly from the Kono ethnic group.  Population figures from past censuses are:  1963: 2,910
1985: 4,101
2004: under 3000

External links
https://archive.today/20130209141754/http://www.world-gazetteer.com/wg.php?x=&men=gpro&lng=en&dat=32&geo=-6642&srt=npan&col=aohdq&pt=c&va=&geo=353464820

Populated places in Sierra Leone
Eastern Province, Sierra Leone